"Mai dire mai (la locura)" is a single by Italian rapper Willie Peyote, released on 4 March 2021, most known for its participation at the 71st edition of the Sanremo Music Festival.

Description 
The song contains a sampling of a line by Valerio Aprea recited in the last episode of the third season of the television series Boris, already included in the title la locura.

The piece was performed for the first time by the artist on the occasion of his participation in the Sanremo Music Festival 2021, finishing sixth in the final evening but winning the Mia Martini Critics' Award.

Videoclip 
The video, shot in Cuneo, was published on 5 March 2021 through the rapper's YouTube channel.

Charts

Certifications

References 

2021 singles
2021 songs
Alternative hip hop songs
Sanremo Music Festival songs